Strathspey Thistle Football Club are a senior football club from Grantown-on-Spey in the Highlands of Scotland. 
They currently play in the Highland Football League, but formerly played in Junior football from 1993.

They were accepted into the Highland League on 25 February 2009 and entered the league for the start of the 2009–10 season.
Their first match was an 8–1 defeat against Wick Academy.

Stadium
Strathspey Thistle's home ground is Seafield Park in Grantown-on-Spey. The stadium has a maximum capacity of 1,600 with 150 seats, after adding a stand and floodlights during the summer of 2009 when the club were elected into the Highland League.

References

External links
 Official website

Football clubs in Scotland
Highland Football League teams
Scottish Junior Football Association clubs
Association football clubs established in 1993
1993 establishments in Scotland
Football in Highland (council area)
Grantown-on-Spey